Burhan Conkeroğlu (1903 – January 2001) was a Turkish wrestler who competed at the 1928 Summer Olympics.

References

External links
 

1903 births
2001 deaths
Olympic wrestlers of Turkey
Wrestlers at the 1928 Summer Olympics
Turkish male sport wrestlers
Place of birth missing